Neil Harris may refer to:

Neil Harris (footballer, born 1894) (1894–1941), Scottish football centre forward and manager
Neil Harris (footballer, born 1977), English football striker and manager
Neil Harris (historian), American art historian
Neil Patrick Harris (born 1973), American actor

See also
Neal Harris, American baseball player